Patrick Rémy (born 27 April 1965 in Gérardmer) was a French cross-country skier who competed from 1990 to 2000. Competing in three Winter Olympics, his best career finish was eighth in the 4 x 10 km relay at Albertville in 1992 while his best individual finish was 20th twice (10 km + 15 km combined pursuit: 1994, 10 km: 1998).

Rémy's best finish at the FIS Nordic World Ski Championships was 26th in the 30 km event at Falun in 1993. His best World Cup finish was fourth in a 30 km event in Canada in 1991.

Rémy earned three individual career victories in lesser events up to 15 km from 1995 to 1998.

External links

Olympic 4 x 10 km relay results: 1936-2002 

1965 births
Living people
Cross-country skiers at the 1988 Winter Olympics
Cross-country skiers at the 1992 Winter Olympics
Cross-country skiers at the 1994 Winter Olympics
Cross-country skiers at the 1998 Winter Olympics
French male cross-country skiers
Olympic cross-country skiers of France
Sportspeople from Vosges (department)
20th-century French people
21st-century French people